The United States Army Chaplain Corps (USACC) consists of ordained clergy of multiple faiths who are commissioned Army officers serving as military chaplains as well as enlisted soldiers who serve as assistants. Their purpose is to offer religious church services, counseling, and moral support to the armed forces, whether in peacetime or at war.

U.S. Army Institute for Religious Leadership

See footnotes

The U.S. Army Institute for Religious Leadership (USAIRL) is part of the Armed Forces Chaplaincy Center (AFCC), which also includes the Air Force Chaplain Service Institute (AFCSI) and the U.S. Naval Chaplaincy School and Center (NCSC). The three schools are co-located at Fort Jackson, in Columbia, S.C.

In 2005, the Base Realignment and Closure Commission decided to put all military ministry training at the same location. While it was authorized, funding was not part of the BRAC, and the Air Force departed Ft Jackson in 2012, currently leaving only the Army and Navy at the Armed Forces Chaplaincy Center.

The purpose of the AFCC was to have closer cooperation among the three chaplain corps and to share instruction and training. While that was the goal, the core curricula were maintained by the three service schools and a joint program of instruction (POI) was never created.

The U.S. Army Chaplain School was approved on 9 February 1918. Its first session began on 3 March 1918, at Fort Monroe, Virginia. Chaplain (MAJ) Aldred A. Pruden, who developed the plan for the school, was named the first commandant of the school. It subsequently moved to Camp Zachary Taylor (Kentucky), Camp Grant (Illinois), Fort Leavenworth (Kansas), Fort Benjamin Harrison (Indiana), Harvard University (Massachusetts), Fort Devens (Mass.), Fort Oglethorpe (Georgia), Carlisle Barracks (Pennsylvania), Fort Slocum (New York) (1951–62), Fort Hamilton (N.Y.) (1962–74), Fort Wadsworth (N.Y.) (1974–79), and Fort Monmouth (New Jersey) (1979–95).

Noncombatant status

Chaplain Candidate
Due to a revision of DA PAM 611-21 (Military Occupational Classification and Structure) Effective 1 October 2013, Chaplain Candidates, previously belonging to the Staff Specialist Branch until ordination have worn the Staff Specialist insignia in lieu of religious denomination insignia. The transition from the Staff Specialist Branch to the Chaplain Branch left the candidates without an authorized branch insignia. Responding to the need, Chief of Chaplains Chaplain (Major General) Donald L. Rutherford submitted a request for collar insignia which was approved by HQDA, G-1 on 23 February 2012. The design for the collar insignia was authorized on 18 June 2012.

Religious Affairs Specialist or NCO

Specialty insignia

For FAQs regarding uniforms and insignia, see footnote

Chiefs of Army Chaplains

The Chief of Chaplains of the United States Army is the head of the Army Chaplaincy. The position was created to better organize the corps. The current Chief of Chaplains is Chaplain (Major General) Thomas L. Solhjem became the United States Army's 25th Chief of Chaplains on 31 May 2019.

Army bases chaplaincy
See footnotes
For a link to the chaplaincy at each of the bases listed below, see general footnote and the footnote following each base

 Fort Benning
 Fort Bragg
 Fort Carson

 Fort Drum
 Fort Gordon
 Fort Huachuca

 Fort Knox
 Fort Leavenworth
 Fort Monroe

 Fort Myer
 Fort Polk
 Fort Sill

 Walter Reed Medical Center

Joint-base chaplaincy

 Joint Base Lewis-McChord
 Joint Base McGuire-Dix-Lakehurst

U.S. Military Academy chaplaincy

Chapels

For all six USMA chapels, see footnote

Chaplains
See footnote

Cadet Prayer
See footnote

Museum

For USA Civil War chaplains, see footnote
For historic photographs of Army chaplains in World War I, World War II, the Korean War, and the Vietnam War, see footnote

The U.S. Army Chaplain Museum is located at Fort Jackson, South Carolina. It was established on 14 August 1957, at the then–United States Army Chaplain School at Fort Slocum, New York. It was dedicated on 10 February 1958, by Chaplain (MG) Patrick J. Ryan, Chief of Chaplains.

"The Four Chaplains"
When the troop-transport ship  was torpedoed during World War II, four Army chaplains ministered to the soldiers and sailors on the sinking ship, gave up their life jackets, and sacrificed their lives when the ship sank. Those chaplains – known as "The Four Chaplains" – were Lt. George L. Fox, Methodist; Lt. Alexander D. Goode, Jewish; Lt. John P. Washington, Roman Catholic; and Lt. Clark V. Poling, Dutch Reformed.

Other notable chaplains
 Patrick J. Boyle-- Colonel, US Army, Roman Catholic Chaplain for the 82nd Airborne Division and 1st Air Cavalry Division, serving three tours during the Vietnam War.  Awarded two Silver Stars, three Bronze Stars, Air Medal, and Parachutist Badge.
John G. Burkhalter – Chaplain during World War II and the Korean War.
 John B. DeValles – Chaplain during World War I.
 Francis P. Duffy – Chaplain during World War I, the most highly decorated cleric in the history of the U.S. Army.
 John H. Eastwood – Chaplain during World War II
 Herman G. Felhoelter – Chaplain during the Korean War. Killed in Chaplain–Medic massacre.
 Augustus F. Gearhard - US Army Catholic chaplain who received the Distinguished Service Cross during World War I, then the Silver Star and Legion of Merit during World War II as a chaplain in the Army Air Forces. Transferred to US Air Force in 1947 and retired as a brigadier general in 1953 after serving as Deputy Chief of Chaplains of the Air Force.
 Dale Goetz – Chaplain during Afghanistan War. First U.S. Army chaplain to be killed in action since the Vietnam War.
 Milton L. Haney – Chaplain during the Civil War. Called "The Fighting Chaplain" by the men of the 55th Illinois Infantry. Awarded the Medal of Honor
 Philip Hannan – Chaplain during World War II.
 Emil J. Kapaun – Chaplain during the Korean War. Died in a POW camp on 23 May 1951. In the process of canonization; awarded the Medal of Honor posthumously in April 2013
 Abraham Klausner – Chaplain during and after World War II who cared for the more than 30,000 survivors found at Dachau concentration camp, shortly after it was liberated in April 1945, as well as for thousands more in other Displaced Persons camps in southern Germany.
 Charles Liteky – Chaplain during Vietnam War. Awarded the Medal of Honor.
 John McElroy, SJ – One of two of the Army's first Catholic chaplains. Chaplain during the Mexican–American War, founder of St. John's Literary Institute, Boston College High School, and Boston College.
 Colman O'Flaherty – Chaplain during World War I. Awarded the Distinguished Service Cross posthumously.
 John D. McCarty – A Protestant Episcopal priest, he served as U.S. Army chaplain at the front, during the Mexican–American War, with General Scott's army.
 Mark Nordstrom – Anglican chaplain during Operation Iraqi Freedom and bishop in the Anglican Church in North America.
 Chaim Potok – Jewish chaplain during the Korean War, author.
 Anthony Rey, S.J. – One of two of the Army's first Catholic chaplains. Chaplain during the Mexican–American War and Vice President of Georgetown College (1845).  First Catholic chaplain killed during service with the U.S. military.
 John Rosbrugh – Chaplain during the Revolutionary War. First U.S. chaplain killed in battle.
 Jeff Struecker – Chaplain for the 75th Ranger Regiment. Prior to chaplaincy, was a sergeant and squad leader of Task Force Ranger during the Battle of Mogadishu. Awarded Bronze Star with Valor device and two oak leaf clusters.
 H. Timothy Vakoc – Chaplain during Iraq War. The only U.S. military chaplain to die from wounds received in the Iraq War.
 Charles J. Watters – Chaplain during the Vietnam War. Awarded the Medal of Honor posthumously.
 Pratima Dharm - First Hindu Chaplain.
 George Wood - Chaplain for the 505th Parachute Infantry Regiment and later for the 82nd Airborne Division during World War II. Only chaplain to have made four combat jumps in WorldWarII. Wood Memorial Chapel in Fort Bragg, NC is named in his honor.
 Matthew A. Zimmerman Jr. – The 18th Chief of Chaplains of the United States Army from 1990 to 1994 and the first African American to hold the position.

Hymn
 Eternal Father, Strong to Save (including special verses for West Point cadets, U.S. armed forces, wounded in combat, and for those deployed)

See also

 United Church, The Chapel on the Hill (former Army chapel)
 United States military chaplains
 United States Air Force Chaplain Corps
 United States Navy Chaplain Corps
 Religious Programs Specialist (Navy)
 Chaplain of the Coast Guard
 Chaplain of the United States Marine Corps
 Armed Forces Chaplains Board (AFCB)
 Chaplains Hill (Arlington National Cemetery)
 List of US Army Chaplain Corps Regimental Awards
 Insignia of Chaplain Schools in the US Military
 Maryland Defense Force Chaplain Corps

Footnotes

Further reading
 Bergen, Doris L. The Sword of the Lord: military chaplains from the first to the twenty-first century (Univ of Notre Dame Press 2004)
 Honeywell, Roy John. Chaplains of the United States Army (Office of the Chief of Chaplains, Department of the Army, 1958)
 Pickard, Scott D. "Co-workers in the field of souls: the Civil War partnership between Union chaplains and the US Christian Commission, 1861–1865." (2013). online
 Shea, Michael E. Sky Pilots: The Yankee Division Chaplains in World War I (2014)
 Stover, Earl F. The United States Army Chaplaincy (Office of the Chief of Chaplains, Department of the Army, 1977)
 O'Malley, Mark. An History of the Development of Catholic Military Chaplaincy in the United States of America (Gregorian University, Rome, 2009)

External links

 US Army Chaplain Corps (United States Army Chaplaincy official homepage). Retrieved 2010-03-04.
 U.S. Army Chaplaincy (DACH). Army.mil/Chaplaincy. Retrieved 2010-03-05.
 Army Chaplain Corps: Overview. GoArmy.com. Retrieved 2010-03-04.
 Army Chaplain Corps: About Army Chaplains. GoArmy.com. Retrieved 2010-03-04.
 Army Chaplain Corps: Chaplain Candidate Program. GoArmy.com. Retrieved 2010-03-04.
 US Army Chaplain Center & School website. Retrieved 2011-02-24.
 Chaplaincy Museum (U.S. Army Chaplaincy official homepage). Retrieved 2011-02-24.
 Zach Morgan (Fort Polk Guardian staff writer), Chaplain Corps crucial to Army. Army.mil. 19 February 2010. Retrieved 2010-03-05.
 Kelvin Davis (Chief of Chaplains), Civilian Clergy Resources: Ministering to Families Affected by Military Deployment. 4 June 2009. Army.mil (U.S. Army official homepage). Retrieved 2010-03-05.
 Military Chaplains Association (MCA) official website. Retrieved 2009-12-03.
 National Conference on Ministry to the Armed Forces (NCMAF) official website. Retrieved 2009-12-03.
 The Four Chaplains Memorial Foundation official website
 Library of Congress audio and video history interviews of former U.S. military chaplains
 
 

 
United States military chaplaincy
Chaplain Corps
Religious occupations
Religion in the United States military